"Grand Unification Part 1" is the second single from the Fightstar album Grand Unification. There are two videos to this song. One of the videos is a mixture of Fightstar playing in a, what would seem to be some sort of cave or room, as well as scenes from Dragonball Z. The second video is the band playing in the same sort of cave/room but without the Dragonball Z scenes. It has since been revealed that the location used was the same as that used by The Prodigy in the controversial video for their song Firestarter, and this has been interpreted as a tribute on the part of Fightstar to The Prodigy.

Much like Paint Your Target, there are 2 recorded versions of Grand Unification Part 1. One, recorded by Chris Sheldon, was released as a single and appeared on the Dragonball Z version of the video. The other version, which appears on Grand Unification, was recorded by Colin Richardson and appeared on the video without the Dragonball Z scenes.

Track listing

Chart performance

References

2005 singles
Fightstar songs
Songs written by Alex Westaway
Songs written by Charlie Simpson
2005 songs
Island Records singles